Auxa basirufipennis is a species of longhorn beetle in the subfamily Lamiinae. It was described by Breuning in 1980 and is endemic to Madagascar.

References

basirufipennis
Beetles described in 1980
Endemic fauna of Madagascar